Hare Warren is a hamlet in the Basingstoke and Deane district of Hampshire, England. At the 2011 Census the population of the hamlet was included in the civil parish of Ecchinswell, Sydmonton and Bishops Green.  Its nearest town is Whitchurch, which lies approximately 4.5 miles (7.0 km) south-west from the hamlet. The hamlet is situated in the North Downs Area of Outstanding Natural Beauty.

Hamlets in Hampshire